Quanah High School is a public high school located in the city of Quanah, Texas (USA) and classified as a 2A school by the UIL.  It is part of the Quanah Independent School District located in central Hardeman County.  In 2015, the school was rated "Met Standard" by the Texas Education Agency.

Academics
Calculator Applications - 
1993(2A)
Journalism - 
1961(2A), 1968(2A)
Literary Criticism - 
2006(1A)
Number Sense - 
1991(2A)

Athletics
The Quanah Indians compete in these sports - 

Volleyball, Cross Country, Football, Basketball, Golf, Tennis, Track, Softball & Baseball

State titles
Boys Golf - 
1994(2A)

State Finalist
Football -  
1961(2A), 1988(2A)

Notable alumni
John Gilliland (Class of 1953) - radio broadcaster.
Edward Givens (Class of 1946) -  astronaut.

References

External links
Quanah ISD

Public high schools in Texas
Schools in Hardeman County, Texas